Journey of Water, Inspired by Moana is an upcoming walkthrough Epcot attraction inspired by the animated film, Moana. It was originally set to open in 2021 as part of Walt Disney World's 50th Anniversary celebration. However, the attraction was delayed to 2023, as part of the "Disney 100 Years of Wonder" celebration, since the opening was postponed indefinitely following the closure of the park due to the COVID-19 pandemic.

Summary 
Journey of Water is a garden featuring interactive fountains and other water features leading from the current Innoventions plaza (replacing much of Innoventions West) down to The Seas Pavilion. Anchored by a massive topiary of Tefiti, Journey of Water serves as whimsical exploration of the water cycle and how it sustains our world.

Further reading
 "BREAKING: New Moana-Inspired “Journey of Water” Walkthrough Maze, Logo Confirmed for Reimagined Epcot", WDW News Today (Aug 22, 2019)
 "Disney World is getting a 'Moana' attraction and there's no telling how far we'll go to get there", USA Today (Aug 26, 2019)
 "EPCOT OVERHAUL: Journey of Water – Inspired by Moana Coming to Epcot (Model, Concept Art, Location, and More)", BlogMickey (Oct 16, 2019)

External links 
 Official Website

References 

Epcot
World Nature
Amusement rides introduced in 2023
Walt Disney Parks and Resorts attractions
Amusement rides based on film franchises
Moana (2016 film)